The name Persian lilac is commonly used for two different woody plants.

 Syringa × persica, a shrub in the olive family (Oleaceae)
 Melia azedarach, a tree in the mahogany family (Meliaceae)